Federica Ranchi (born 5 May 1939) is an Italian former film actress.

Life and career 
Born in Trieste, while a student at liceo linguistico was noted by a Cines employee through a picture of her ballet company, and subsequently won an audition for the Leonardo De Mitri's comedy-drama Wives and Obscurities.

Typically cast in roles of sensitive and fragile women, following several roles with auteurs such as Valerio Zurlini and Gillo Pontecorvo and in some genre films, in 1963 Ranchi married a Greek shipowner and eventually retired from showbusiness, even refusing a five-year contract with Dino De Laurentiis.

She is the grandmother of actress and fitness model Flavia Sgoifo.

Selected filmography 

Wives and Obscurities (1956)
 The Wide Blue Road (1957)
Devil's Cavaliers (1959) 
Estate Violenta (1959) 
Son of Samson (1960)
Goliath and the Dragon (1960) 
Women of Devil's Island (1962)

References

External links 
 

1939 births
Living people
Actors from Trieste
Italian film actresses
20th-century Italian actresses